Dzwonowo may refer to the following places:
Dzwonowo, Greater Poland Voivodeship (west-central Poland)
Dzwonowo, Stargard County in West Pomeranian Voivodeship (north-west Poland)
Dzwonowo, Wałcz County in West Pomeranian Voivodeship (north-west Poland)